"Funplex" is a song recorded by The B-52s. It is the title track and first single from the band's eighth full-length studio album Funplex. The single was released to iTunes Store's internationally as a digital download on 29 January 2008.

Remixes
Remixes of the track by Peaches, Cansei de Ser Sexy and Scissor Sisters were released digitally on 5 March 2008.

Music video
A music video was filmed in West Hollywood on March 1, 2008 and featured a cameo appearance at the end by RuPaul, who appeared in the video for "Love Shack". The video features the band performing in a CGI shopping mall and premiered on MySpace on March 26, 2008.

References to mall culture
Lyrics in the song, "Private property–hippie be quiet / Your peace sign T-shirt / Could cause a riot" refer to the 2003 Crossgates Mall T-shirt censorship controversy.

The 'Cansei de Ser Sexy' remix of Funplex is featured in the dancing video game, Just Dance for the Nintendo Wii. It also appears as DLC on Xbox 360 versions of Just Dance 3

Track listing
 "Funplex" (CSS Remix) – 4:25
 "Funplex" (CSS Extended Remix) – 5:04
 "Funplex" (CSS Instrumental) – 5:00
 "Funplex" (CSS Edit) – 3:20
 "Funplex" (Peaches Pleasure Seeker Remix) – 4:42
 "Funplex" (Peaches Pleasure Seeker Instrumental) – 4:42
 "Funplex" (Peaches Pleasure Seeker Edit) – 2:58
 "Funplex" (Scissor Sisters Witches At The Wet Seal Remix) – 8:32
 "Funplex" (Scissor Sisters Witches At The Wet Seal Instrumental) – 8:32
 "Funplex" (Scissor Sisters Witches At The Wet Seal Edit) – 4:10

Chart performance

References

External links
 Music video for "Funplex" on YouTube

2008 singles
2007 songs
The B-52's songs
Songs written by Fred Schneider
Songs written by Kate Pierson
Songs written by Keith Strickland
Songs written by Cindy Wilson
Astralwerks singles